Guled Haji was a Somali sage and the Aqil or leader of the Baha Sugule branch of the powerful Rer Ainanshe Habr Yunis. The Rer Ainashe are the traditional rulers of the Habr Yunis Sultanate.

Biography
Guled had completed the Hajj pilgrimage to Makkah and adopted the honorific Hajji title and was referred to as such rather than his full name. He was a grandson of the first Sultan of the Habr Yunis Sugulleh Ainashe. According to Italian explorer Enrico Baudi i Vesme, who visited Burao in 1889, Guled Haji was a prominent chief of Burao ranking second only to Sultan Awad Deria. Guled Haji has a town named after him in the Oodweyne district of Togdheer.

Proverbs
Guled was known for his wise speech and proverbs and he gave birth to hundreds of them in the Somali language and some are still used in the present day. 

what one needs for survival ( water inst.)  is imperative no matter how far/hard one has to labour.  a worthwhile endeavour regardless of the distance

Here he is implying superficial beauty hides ill substance.

The Habr Je'lo had asked Guled which man among them was the wisest but he responded with this remark " if i divulge his name , you would instantly kill him" by pronouncing him the wiset Guuleed a famous sage words would sentence such a man to death making him a target for revenge. Somali nomads usually seek the best of men for their revenge killings. Guled was keen to preserve harmony and as a powerful individual he was aware his words carried weight.

War with Hersi Aman
Sultan Hersi Aman's increasing grip and autocratic rule over the Habr Yunis had fermented some resentment amongst his direct subclan (Rer Sugule) and some stood to challenge him. Guled had a fallout with Sultan Hersi and his son was killed by one of Hersis' sons in battle. Hersi's son approached his father and implored him to pay the traditional mag compensation to Guled for the loss of his child. Hersi arrogantly rebuffed his son and all-out conflict would break out between Ba Awal (Hersi's branch) and Baho Sugule branches of the Rer Sugule.

Fighting would continue and one Baha Sugulle leading warrior Warsame Dhakaar had slain 3 brothers of Ba Awal . Pressured to spare the 4th teenager brother Jama Ammume ( Jama Warsame "Dhinbiil" Yusuf sultan Diiriye) also known as " Ammume (the Mute)" a great-grandson of Sultan Deria Sugule who was from a different house  "Bah" (wife of sultan Deria). Warsame reluctantly pressured by his men urging him not to make the mother virtually childless at her age, he relented adding a contemptuous remark "Having killed all her worthy sons let her use this one begging for offals."These words have deeply injured the Mute, so much that he couldn't hide it and had to admit it in his poem after killing Warsame " now that i have quenched my thirst healing my festering wound from his injurious mouth", during the next clash Jama would mortally wound Warsame and recited his first ever poem . In it, he praises his horse 'Hamar' that performed well that day and speaks about Warsame. These poems were recorded by Luigi Robecchi Bricchetti in his 1889 articale.

Death of Hersi Aman

The Sultan Hersi himself was killed in previous battles making his clan belligerent pushing the war even though in all purpose have been defeated. At last offered an honorable offer they accepted the terms when  Warsame having killed 3 brothers of their clan, hearing of the amount of the restitutions in livestocks in the hundreds collected from everyman including Warsame, Warsame scornfully replied " let the herds of the coward be collected for such compensations, am not"  that and killing the 3 brothers ignited the war again killin the compromise deal. A widow lamenting the loss of her husband Gaydh,and her brother Mohammed Golaxle ( the  funnel chested) Pectus excavatum including Sultan Xirsi, she urged her son Ali to avenege his father and others and she scathingly emasculated others for living under the hemp of women's skirt  other relatives in this poem

One of the sons of the Sultan recited these lines in a reply to Warsame's line.

Continuation of the War
Following Hersi's death the Rer Sugule gathered and the issue of compensation for the Sultan's death was a pressing issue. The conflict originally starting because no compensation had been paid to Guled Haji for his son. They decided that none would be paid for Xirsi the instigator or his son but the rest were  compensated (the numbers of killings surpassing the other party) difference in death.

Maxamed Bulxan's poem touches on the unique nature of the meeting

Despite this 2 year conflict culminating in Hersi's death it would not entirely end. Both Awad Deria and Nur Ahmed Aman were proclaimed Sultan by their respective branches (Baho Sugule and Ba Awal respectively) with Sultan Nur eventually triumphing as the uncontested Sultan. Guled was a strong supporter of Sultan Awad and during the period of division, the rival sultans would split Habr Yunis territory in two and the lucrative caravan routes to tax. Sultan Nur held the Jerato pass and Tuuyo plains and his rival Sultan Awad Deria secured Burao as his base until his death, with Sultan Nur ultimately taking control of it.

See also
Hersi Aman
Awad Deria
Burao
Garhajis

References

Somalian Muslims
19th-century Somalian people
20th-century Somalian people
1820s births
Year of birth uncertain
1908 deaths
Ethnic Somali people